Mohammad Amir Khan may refer to:
 Mohammad Amir Khan (field hockey)
 Mohammad Amir Khan (cricketer)

See also
 Mohammad Khan (disambiguation)
 Amir Khan (disambiguation)